Acleris fragariana is a species of moth of the family Tortricidae. It is found in North America, where it has been recorded from Alberta, California, Maine, Minnesota, New Hampshire, New York, Ontario and Washington.

The wingspan is 15–16 mm. The forewings are pale orange-yellow in the basal half and with reddish-purple suffusion over the outer area and along the inner margin to the base. Adults have been recorded on wing from July to October.

The larvae feed on Myrica gale, Aronia melanocarpa, Fragaria (including Fragaria virginiana), Prunus, Rosa, Rubus and Pouteria species.

References

Moths described in 1904
fragariana
Moths of North America